KFQX, virtual channel 4 (UHF digital channel 15), is a Fox-affiliated television station licensed to Grand Junction, Colorado, United States, and serving Colorado's Western Slope region. The station is owned by Wichita Falls, Texas–based Mission Broadcasting; Nexstar Media Group, which owns CBS affiliate KREX-TV (channel 5) and low-power, Class A MyNetworkTV affiliate KGJT-CD (channel 27, which KREX simulcasts on its third digital subchannel), operates KFQX under a shared services agreement (SSA). The stations share studios on Hillcrest Avenue in downtown Grand Junction, while KFQX's transmitter is located at the Black Ridge Electronics Site at the Colorado National Monument west of the city.

History
KFQX signed on the air on June 17, 2000. Before KFQX's sign-on, Fox programming was seen on low-power station KJCT-LP (now sister station KJCT-LD) between 1995 and 2000, and before that, Grand Junction had been one of the few markets in the United States without an over-the-air Fox affiliate. Most cable systems in the market received the national Foxnet service or KDVR in Denver.
  
For its first few years, KFQX offered delayed rebroadcasts of KREX's newscasts. In 2005, the station began simulcasting news programming from former Fox owned-and-operated station now sister station KDVR. Today, the simulcasts include a three-hour weekday morning newscast (Fox 31 Morning News from 6 to 9 a.m.), a weeknight newscast at 5:30, and a nightly prime time newscast from 9:30 to 10:30 p.m Monday through Friday and 9:00 to 10:00 p.m. on Saturdays and Sundays. KFQX broadcasts local newscasts produced out of KREX-TV from 6:30 to 7:00 p.m. and 9:00 to 9:30 p.m., for a total of five hours of local news.

On November 20, 2013, Gray Television announced it would purchase Hoak Media and Parker Broadcasting in a $335 million deal. KFQX will be sold to Excalibur Broadcasting; however, Gray will sell KREX and Excalibur will sell KFQX due to ownership limits; Gray already owns KKCO and operates Excalibur-owned KJCT. On December 19, Gray announced that KREX and its satellites will be sold to Nexstar Broadcasting Group, while KFQX will be sold to Mission Broadcasting, for $37.5 million. The sale of KREX was completed on June 13. Nexstar will provide services to KFQX, while it awaits FCC approval. The sale was approved on February 27, 2017.  The sale was finalized on March 31.

KREX-TV studio fire

A fire knocked KREX, KFQX and KGJT-LP off the air on January 20, 2008 at approximately 8:45 a.m. local time. The station's building and 50 years worth of archives are a total loss.

Technical information

Subchannels
The station's digital signal is multiplexed:

Translators

References

External links
Official site

Television channels and stations established in 2000
2000 establishments in Colorado
FQX
Nexstar Media Group
Fox network affiliates
Ion Mystery affiliates
Grit (TV network) affiliates